Mark M. Smith is an American historian and the Carolina Distinguished Professor of History at the University of South Carolina.  Smith holds a B.A. University of Southampton (1988) & M.A. University of South Carolina (1991) and a Ph.D. University of South Carolina (1995). Smith is a scholar of sensory history, which he described to an interviewer as stressing “the role of the senses—including sight and vision—in shaping people's experiences in the past and shows how they understood their worlds and why.”

Books
 1997: Mastered by the Clock: Time, Slavery, and Freedom in the American South (co-winner of the Organization of American Historians' 1998 Avery O. Craven Award and South Carolina Historical Society's Book of the Year)
 1998: Debating Slavery: Economy and Society in the Antebellum American South. Cambridge University Press
 2000: The Old South, (as editor). Oxford: Blackwell
 2001: Listening to Nineteenth-Century America. Chapel Hill: University of North Carolina Press
 2004: Hearing History: a reader, (as editor). Athens: University of Georgia Press
 2006:  How Race is Made: Slavery, Segregation, and the Senses. Chapel Hill: University of North Carolina Press

References

Historians of the United States
Living people
21st-century American historians
21st-century American male writers
Alumni of the University of Southampton
University of South Carolina alumni
University of South Carolina faculty
Year of birth missing (living people)
American male non-fiction writers